Zemo Khevi is a village at an altitude of 100 meters ASL, at the southern slope of Gagra Range in the Gagra District of Abkhazia, Georgia. Distance to Gagra is 15 km.

See also
 Gagra District

Notes

Literature 
 Georgian Soviet Encyclopedia, V. 4, p. 512, Tb., 1979.

References

Populated places in Gagra District